Takehisa (written: 武久) is a masculine Japanese given name. Notable people with the name include:

, Japanese cyclist
, Japanese classical composer
, Japanese mayor
, Japanese Go player
, Japanese footballer
Takehisa Yaegashi (born 1943), Japanese automotive engineer

Takehisa (written: 竹久) is also a Japanese surname. Notable people with the surname include:

, Japanese poet and painter

Japanese-language surnames
Japanese masculine given names